Grenville was an electoral district of the Legislative Assembly of the Parliament of the Province of Canada, in Canada West.  Based on Grenville County, it was located on the north shore of the Saint Lawrence River, east of Lake Ontario. It was created in 1841, upon the establishment of the Province of Canada by the union of Upper Canada and Lower Canada. Grenville was represented by one member in the Legislative Assembly.  It was later split into two ridings, in a redistribution.

Boundaries 

Grenville electoral district was located on the north shore of the Saint Lawrence River in the eastern area of Canada West, east of Kingston. It was based on Grenville County (now the United Counties of Leeds and Grenville).

The Union Act, 1840 had merged the two provinces of Upper Canada and Lower Canada into the Province of Canada, with a single Parliament.  The separate parliaments of Lower Canada and Upper Canada were abolished.Union Act, 1840, 3 & 4 Vict., c. 35, s. 2.  The Union Act provided that the pre-existing electoral boundaries of Upper Canada would continue to be used in the new Parliament, unless altered by the Union Act itself.

Grenville County had been an electoral district in the Legislative Assembly of Upper Canada,  and its boundaries were not altered by the Union Act. Those boundaries had originally been set by a proclamation of the first Lieutenant Governor of Upper Canada, John Graves Simcoe, in 1792:

The boundaries had been further defined by a statute of Upper Canada in 1798:

Since Grenville electoral district was not changed by the Union Act, those boundaries continued to be used for the new electoral district. Grenville was represented by one member in the Legislative Assembly.

Members of the Legislative Assembly 

Grenville was represented by one member in the Legislative Assembly. The following were the members for Grenville.

Abolition 

The district was later split into two different ridings, in a redistribution.

References 

.

  Electoral districts of Canada West